No More Fish, No Fishermen is a song whose lyrics were composed by Canadian folklorist and singer Shelley Posen, about the demise of the Newfoundland fishery. Although it was written in 1996, it is often assumed to be a traditional song.  The tune is based upon "Coal Not Dole" by Kay Sutcliffe and  Paul Abrahams, who wrote the lyrics and melody respectively, about the death of the coal industry in northern England. "Coal Not Dole" was made popular by Coope Boyes and Simpson on their Funny Old World album, and is in turn based on the Victorian Christmas carol, "See, Amid The Winter's Snow".  It is set to the hymn tune Humility by John Goss, written in 1871.

Posen recorded "No More Fish, No Fishermen" with the group Finest Kind (on their CD Heart's Delight) as an a capella, three-part vocal; and on his solo CD The Old Songs' Home, with a jangle pop musical arrangement reminiscent of The Byrds.

Covers
 Finest Kind Heart's Delight
 Shelley Posen The Old Songs' Home
 Adam Miller The Orphan Train and Other Reminiscences
 Johnny Collins Now & Then
 Bill Garrett & Sue Lothrop Red Shoes 2003
 David Coffin Last trip home 2009

References

1996 songs
Shelley Posen songs
Songs about fish
Songs about fishers
Environmental songs
Songs about Canada